Joy Annabelle Womack (born April 20, 1994) is an American ballet dancer. She is the first American woman to graduate from the Bolshoi Ballet Academy’s main training program with a red diploma, and the second American woman to sign a contract with the Bolshoi Ballet. She was a principal dancer with the Universal Ballet and Kremlin Ballet, Astrakhan Opera and Ballet Theatre and is currently an extra dancer with Paris Opera Ballet .

Early life and education
Womack was born in Beverly Hills, California and raised in California and Texas, one of nine children. She trained at the Kirov Academy of Ballet before attending the Bolshoi Ballet Academy in 2009 after Academy teachers noticed her at that year's summer intensive. She was fifteen years old at the time.

During her first year at the Academy, Womack was among a group of students selected to perform for a regular Bolshoi audience in a special gala, along with the stars of the Bolshoi Ballet itself; she performed despite needing surgery for a bone injury. She received the surgery later after a parishioner at her English-language church in Moscow offered to pay.

Career
Some of Womack's classical repertoire includes the roles of Giselle in Giselle, Masha in The Nutcracker, the pas de deux from Diana and Acteon, and Princess Budur in One Thousand and One Nights.

In November 2013, Womack announced in an interview with Izvestia that she was leaving the Bolshoi Ballet, which she claimed was fraught with corruption. During the interview, she made allegations of extortion from an unnamed director in exchange for a solo part in a performance in September of that year. Although some dancers, such as Alexander Petukhov, denied the allegations stating, "...If she knows something, let her name those people. Why smear the theater like that?" Others, such as Natalia Vyskubeno, supported Womack's account. Womack herself described this time as "...like breaking up with your first love."

In 2014, at the age of 19, she became a principal dancer of the Kremlin Ballet Theatre of Moscow. She left the company in 2017. In 2018, she was a principal dancer with the Universal Ballet in Seoul, South Korea. Womack also guest performed in Sofia National Opera and Ballet, Kracow Opera and Ballet & The Russian State Ballet. She joined the Boston Ballet as an artist in 2019. The following year she joined the Astrakhan Opera and Ballet Theatre as prima ballerina.

Womack is the founder of Project Prima, a supplement company that caters specifically to dancers and performance athletes. She is also a Gaynor Girl Pro Ambassador for Gaynor Minden, and a model for Cloud and Victory, a dance wear and ballet brand.

Womack will appear in an upcoming documentary, Joy Womack: The White Swan, made by Dina Burlis, Danila Kuznetsov and Sergey Gavrilov. It debuted in June 2020 at the Marché du Film at Cannes and is currently in post-production.

New Zealand filmmaking team James Napier Robertson and Tom Hern have announced a biopic called Joika, based on Womack's life in Russia. Actress Talia Ryder will play Womack, and Womack will serve as her dancing double and trainer. Diane Kruger will play Womack's ballet teacher and mentor in the film. The film is expected to begin filming in Poland in early 2022.

Womack joined Paris Opera Ballet as a extra dancer in January 2023

Personal life
Womack announced her engagement to Andrew Hale Clay on September 30, 2020.

Awards
In 2011 she won the Grand Prix award at the Youth America Grand Prix in Paris, France.

In 2012, Womack was awarded the Grand Prix Award at one of the 13 Youth America Grand Prix semi-finals.

In 2013, she was awarded the Asian Grand Prix Award at the Asian Grand Prix in Hong Kong.

In 2014 she won the Globex Promotion award for Emerging Expressive Talent.

In 2014 she won the Silver Medal Arabesque Ballet Competition in Perm, Russia.

In 2015, she won 1st Prize Ballet Professional & 2nd Prize Contemporary Professional in Bari Ballet Competition Italy.

In July 2016, Womack won silver medal at the International Ballet Competition at Varna, Bulgaria.

In 2017 she won Gold at Korea International Ballet Competition.

References

External links
 
 Official youtube channel

Living people
American ballerinas
1994 births
Moscow State Academy of Choreography alumni
People from Beverly Hills, California
People from Austin, Texas
American YouTubers
American expatriates in Russia
American expatriates in South Korea
21st-century American ballet dancers
Dancers from Texas
21st-century American women